"The Adventure of the Blanched Soldier" (1926) is one of 12 Sherlock Holmes short stories by British writer Arthur Conan Doyle, include in The Case-Book of Sherlock Holmes; it was first published in the US in Liberty in October 1926, and in the UK in The Strand Magazine in November 1926, and is one of 56 short stories in the canon of Sherlock Holmes. This story is one of only two narrated by Holmes rather than Doctor Watson, the other one being "The Adventure of the Lion's Mane". Dr. Watson does not appear in either story.

Plot 
In January 1903, at Baker Street, James M. Dodd sees Holmes about a missing friend, Godfrey Emsworth. Dodd and Emsworth served in the Imperial Yeomanry in South Africa during the recent Second Boer War. Emsworth was wounded. Dodd has not seen him since the report of his injury, leading Dodd to believe something is amiss.

Dodd wrote to Colonel Emsworth, Godfrey's father, and was told Godfrey went off to sea, but Dodd was not satisfied with this answer. Next, Dodd went to the Emsworth family home, Tuxbury Old Park, near Bedford. There were four people there—the Colonel and his wife, and an old butler and his wife. The Colonel was less than gracious. He repeated the story about his son's world voyage, implied Dodd was lying about knowing Godfrey, and seemed irritated at Dodd's suggestion he provide information so he could send a letter to Godfrey.

Dodd determined to ascertain Godfrey's fate. That evening, in the ground-floor bedroom, Dodd talked to the butler, Ralph. After Ralph mentioned Godfrey in the past tense, Dodd suspected his friend was dead. Ralph indicated no, but dead might be better.

The mystery was complicated after Dodd observed Godfrey's face in his window, proving he was on the grounds and not at sea as the colonel claimed. Dodd chased him, but quit after hearing a closing door nearby.

Dodd contrived to stay another day at Tuxbury Old Park, and went looking about the property. He saw a well-dressed man leaving an outbuilding, whose suspicion was aroused because Dodd was aware he was watching him. Dodd was convinced Godfrey must be in this outbuilding.

Dodd went back to the outbuilding at night, and observed the well-dressed man and another, who he assumed was Godfrey, through the window. Before he could investigate, Colonel Emsworth appeared. Upset about Dodd violating the family's privacy, he insisted Dodd leave immediately.

Dodd went straight to Holmes to relate the story. Holmes needs only to ask about the publication the man with Godfrey was reading, and although Dodd cannot be certain, Holmes seems satisfied with the answer.

Upon his arrival at Tuxbury Old Park, Holmes observes a tarry smell coming from the leather gloves Ralph removed. The Colonel threatens to summon the police if Dodd and Holmes do not leave, but Holmes points out that would cause the catastrophe the Colonel wants to avoid.

Convincing the colonel he knows the secret, Holmes receives permission to visit the outbuilding; he and Dodd hear Godfrey's story right from his lips. The night he was wounded in South Africa, he went to a house and slept in a bed. After he woke, he realized he was surrounded by lepers. A doctor there told him he was in a leper hospital, and would likely contract the disease after sleeping in a leper's bed. The doctor helped heal his wounds; after Godfrey returned to England, the dreaded symptoms appeared. His family's fear of their son getting institutionalized and the stigma attached to leprosy forced them to conceal his presence.

The story ends happily. Holmes brings Sir James Saunders, a famous dermatologist from London.  Dr. Saunders determines Emsworth has ichthyosis, or pseudo-leprosy, a treatable disease.

Related stories
Holmes's investigation of the mystery is delayed because he is engaged in clearing up "the case which my friend Watson has described as that of the Abbey School, in which the Duke of Greyminster was so deeply involved". The Duke of Holdernesse was the principal client in the case of the Priory School.

Publication history
"The Adventure of the Blanched Soldier" was first published in the US in Liberty in October 1926, and in the UK in The Strand Magazine in November 1926. The story was published with five illustrations by Frederic Dorr Steele in Liberty, and with five illustrations by Howard K. Elcock in the Strand. It was included in the short story collection The Case-Book of Sherlock Holmes, which was published in the UK and the US in June 1927.

Adaptations
The story was dramatised by Edith Meiser as episodes of the American radio series The Adventures of Sherlock Holmes that aired on 2 March 1931 (with Richard Gordon as Sherlock Holmes and Leigh Lovell as Dr. Watson) and 2 May 1936 (with Gordon as Holmes and Harry West as Watson).

Meiser also adapted the story as an episode of the American radio series The New Adventures of Sherlock Holmes that aired on 19 February 1940 (with Basil Rathbone as Holmes and Nigel Bruce as Watson).

Michael Hardwick dramatised "The Blanched Soldier" for the BBC Light Programme in August 1959 as part of the 1952–1969 radio series starring Carleton Hobbs as Sherlock Holmes and Norman Shelley as Dr. Watson, with Frederick Treves as James M. Dodd.

The story was adapted for BBC Radio 4 in 1994 by Roger Danes as part of the 1989–1998 radio series starring Clive Merrison as Holmes and Michael Williams as Watson. It featured Robert Glenister as James Dodd, Hannah Gordon as Jean Watson, and Derek Waring as Colonel Emsworth.

In 2014, the story was adapted for radio as an episode of The Classic Adventures of Sherlock Holmes, a series on the American radio show Imagination Theatre, with John Patrick Lowrie as Holmes and Lawrence Albert as Watson.

References

Sources

External links

Blanched Soldier, The Adventure of the
1926 short stories
Works originally published in Liberty (general interest magazine)